Phungia is a genus of beetles in the family Mordellidae, containing the following species:

 Phungia camerunensis Ermisch, 1950
 Phungia rufa Pic, 1922
 Phungia scraptiiformis (Franciscolo, 1961)
 Phungia trotommoides (Franciscolo, 1962)

References

Mordellidae